Humunlai is a village within Kale Township, Sagaing Region, Myanmar.

Populated places in Sagaing Region